The 1977 Cal State Fullerton Titans football team represented California State University, Fullerton as a member of the Pacific Coast Athletic Association (PCAA) during the 1977 NCAA Division I football season. Led by third-year head coach Jim Colletto, Cal State Fullerton compiled an overall record 4–7 with a mark of 0–4 in conference play, placing last out of five teams in the PCAA. The Titans played home games at Falcon Stadium on the campus of Cerritos College in Norwalk, California.

Schedule

Notes

References

Cal State Fullerton
Cal State Fullerton Titans football seasons
Cal State Fullerton Titans football